Eulamius, born in Phrygia, was, along with Damascius, one of the Athenian philosophers who sought asylum at the court of Khosrau I (r. 531–579) of Persia in 531/532 when Byzantine emperor Justinian I (r. 527–565) closed down the last pagan philosophical schools in Athens. Eulamius was disappointed  in Persia and ultimately returned to Byzantium in 532 together with other Greek philosophers, protected by a treaty that guaranteed their safety. His name appears as Eulalios (Greek: Eὐλάλιος) in the Suda and as Eulamios (Greek: Eὐλάμιος) in the historical works of Agathias.

References

Sources

6th-century philosophers
6th-century Byzantine people
Byzantine philosophers
Roman Phrygia
Ancient Athenian philosophers
People from the Sasanian Empire